Ælfric (Old English , Middle English Elfric) is an Anglo-Saxon given name.

Churchmen
Ælfric of Eynsham (c. 955–c. 1010), late 10th century Anglo-Saxon abbot and writer
Ælfric of Abingdon (died 1005), late 10th century Anglo-Saxon Archbishop of Canterbury
Ælfric Bata (or "the bat") (fl. 1005)
Ælfric Puttoc (died 1051), 11th century Anglo-Saxon Archbishop of York
Ælfric of Crediton, late 10th century Anglo-Saxon Bishop of Crediton
Ælfric (Bishop of Hereford), mid 10th century Anglo-Saxon Bishop of Hereford
Ælfric of Ramsbury (fl. 940s), Bishop of Ramsbury
Ælfric (archbishop-elect of Canterbury) (fl. 1050), Benedictine monk elected to but denied the see of Canterbury
Ælfric I (died c. 973), Bishop of Elmham
Ælfric II (died 1038), Bishop of Elmham
Ælfric III (died c. 1042), Bishop of Elmham

Laymen
Ælfric Cild, late 10th century Anglo-Saxon Ealdorman of Mercia
Ælfric of Hampshire, late 10th century/early 11th century Anglo-Saxon Ealdorman of Hampshire
Ælfric Modercope, 11th century Anglo-Danish thegn

See also
Elfric (comics), an antagonist in the fantasy comic series Sláine
Aubrey